George Stevens (April 22, 1803 – August 15, 1894) was an American manufacturer and politician who served as the third Mayor of Cambridge, Massachusetts.

Personal life 
Stevens was born to Nathaniel and Rebecca (Cobb) Stevens in Norway, Maine, on April 22, 1803. He had one brother, William whom he worked with in the pipe organ industry.

Professional life 
Stevens and his brother William worked as apprentices for pipe organ manufacturer William Goodrich. Stevens took over Goodrich's firm and for two years starting in 1833, Stevens was a proprietor with William Gayetty of Stevens & Gayetty in East Cambridge, Massachusetts, however for most of his career, Stevens worked on his own. Stevens built over eight hundred pipe organs, he supplied many small churches with one- and two-manual organs.

Notes

1803 births
1894 deaths
Mayors of Cambridge, Massachusetts
People from Norway, Maine
American pipe organ builders
19th-century American politicians
Musical instrument manufacturing companies of the United States